María Isabel is a Mexican telenovela produced by Valentín Pimstein for Telesistema Mexicano in 1966.

Cast 
Silvia Pinal as María Isabel
Raúl Ramírez as Ricardo
Fernando Mendoza
Ada Carrasco
José Carlos Ruiz as Pedro
Irma Lozano as Rosa Isela
Eduardo McGregor as Rogelio
Andrea Cotto as Gloria
Bárbara Gil as Mireya
Oscar Morelli as Leobardo
Fernando Mendoza as Felix
Vicky Aguirre
Aurora Cortes
Elisabeth Dupeyrón

References

External links 

Mexican telenovelas
1966 telenovelas
Televisa telenovelas
Spanish-language telenovelas
Television shows based on comics
1966 Mexican television series debuts
1966 Mexican television series endings